Eyjafjallajökull is a 2013 French comedy film directed by Alexandre Coffre.

Plot summary 
Divorced couple Valérie and Alain make their way to their daughter's wedding during the volcanic eruptions of Eyjafjallajökull.

Cast 
 Valérie Bonneton - Valérie
 Dany Boon - Alain
 Denis Ménochet - Ezéchiel
 Albert Delpy - Tonton Roger
 Bérangère McNeese - Cécile
 Constance Dollé - Sylvie
 Malik Bentalha - Cécile's friend
 Myriam Azencot - Airplane seatmate
 Arnaud Henriet - Alain's airplane seatmate
 Yann Sorton - Stewart the Greek
 Jochen Hägele - German Avis Agent
 Barbara Ornellas - Woman in motorcoach

References

External links 

2010s comedy road movies
French comedy road movies
2010s French-language films
Films about divorce
2013 comedy films
2013 films
2010s French films